Lincoln Pius X High School is a Catholic high school in Lincoln, Nebraska and the Diocese of Lincoln. The school was founded October 1, 1956 by Bishop Louis B. Kucera.

History
Pius X High School was founded in 1956.

Academics
Pius X has won state championships in academic decathlon.

Athletics
Because of rising enrollment, Pius X moved from Class B to Class A for the 2016-17 school year.

In addition to the NSAA championships, Pius X bowling has also won state championships in both boys' and girls' bowling.

Performing arts
Pius X has two competitive show choirs, the mixed-gender "Spectrum" and the all-female "Prism".

Notable alumni
 Joe Glenn, football player and coach
 Tyler Polak, soccer player
 Brandon Teena, transgender man whose 1993 murder was memorialized in the film Boys Don't Cry; attended Pius X but was expelled in his senior year
 Adam Treu, football player
 Greg Zuerlein, football player
 Valerie Dodds, adult film actress

References

External links 
 
 Private School Review profile of Lincoln Pius X

Roman Catholic Diocese of Lincoln
Educational institutions established in 1956
1956 establishments in Nebraska
Schools in Lincoln, Nebraska
Catholic secondary schools in Nebraska